Kyrre Gørvell-Dahll (born 11 September 1991), known professionally as Kygo, is a Norwegian DJ and music producer. He garnered international attention with his December 2013 remix of the track "I See Fire" by Ed Sheeran and his December 2014 single "Firestone" (featuring Conrad Sewell). In late 2015, he became the fastest artist to reach 1 billion streams on Spotify, and by June 2016, he had reached 2 billion streams on Spotify.

Kygo has since released several singles, such as "Stole the Show", "Here for You", and "Stay" in 2015, "It Ain't Me" collaborating with Selena Gomez in 2017 and a 2019 remix of "Higher Love" performed by Whitney Houston, all of which have debuted on several international charts. His debut album, Cloud Nine, was released on 13 May 2016. 

Kygo became the first house music producer to perform at an Olympics closing ceremony in August 2016 at the 2016 Rio Olympics. In March 2018, Billboard ranked Kygo 3rd on its 2018 ranking of dance musicians titled Billboard Dance 100. The same year, he was ranked 32 on DJ Mags top 100 DJs of the world, and in October 2019 he was ranked 42.

Kygo's stage name is derived from the first two letters of his first and last names, generated during his use of Itslearning.

Early life 
Kygo was born on 11 September 1991 in Singapore to Norwegian parents and raised in Tønsberg. He is the son of Kjersti Gjerde, a dentist in Norway, and Lars Gørvell-Dahll, who was working abroad in the maritime industry. He has an older stepbrother Mads, two older sisters Johanne and Jenny, and a younger half-brother Sondre. Throughout his childhood, he lived and travelled with his family in Brazil, Japan, Kenya and Egypt.

Kygo started taking piano lessons at the age of six and considers himself more of a pianist than a disc jockey. He stopped when he was 15 or 16 and started producing music with Logic Studio and a MIDI keyboard while watching several tutorials on YouTube. When he decided to pursue music full-time, he was halfway through a degree in business and finance at Heriot-Watt University in Edinburgh, Scotland. He has cited Swedish DJ Avicii as his main inspiration.

Career

2014: Breakthrough 

On 15 May 2013, Kygo released his first single called "Epsilon" on the Romanian record label Ensis Records. On 1 December 2014, he released the single "Firestone", featuring vocals from Conrad Sewell, which gained international recognition and debuted on several charts worldwide, being streamed 810 million times on YouTube and 901 million times on Spotify, as of 12 April 2022. After receiving over 80 million views on YouTube and SoundCloud, Kygo was contacted by Avicii and by Chris Martin of Coldplay to create a remix of the song "Midnight". He has also supported Avicii at Findings Festival in Oslo, Norway, in 2014. On 19 September 2014, it was confirmed that Kygo was to replace Avicii at mainstage in Tomorrowland, due to Avicii's health concerns.

He was also featured in an interview for Billboard magazine, where he talked to writer Matt Medved about his remixes for Diplo and Coldplay, and talked about his upcoming tour in North America. In July 2014, Kygo entered into a partnership with EDM lifestyle brand Electric Family to produce a collaboration bracelet for which one hundred per cent of the proceeds are donated to Médecins Sans Frontières. In the same month, he signed a record label deal with Sony International and Ultra Music.

2015–2016: Cloud Nine and Kygo Life 
In February 2015, Kygo's song "ID" was featured in the official trailer for Ultra Music Festival. The same track is also featured on FIFA 16, a popular association football video game by EA Sports. On 21 March 2015, he released his second single, titled "Stole the Show", featuring Parson James, which as of 2 January 2019, had 326 million views on YouTube. On 31 July 2015, he released his third single, "Nothing Left", featuring Will Heard. "Nothing Left" reached number one on the Norwegian Singles Chart. In August 2015, Kygo was a featured headliner at Lollapalooza in Chicago, one of the biggest music festivals in the world. On 4 September 2015, he released his fourth single, titled "Here for You", featuring Ella Henderson, which was revealed to be the vocal version of the song "ID" that was released as part of the Ultra Music Festival. He made his U.S. television debut on The Late Late Show with James Corden in October 2015.

Three months later, his fifth single, "Stay", produced with fellow Norwegian record producer William Larsen and featuring vocals by Maty Noyes, was released on 4 December 2015. In December 2015, Kygo became the fastest artist in history to reach one billion streams on Spotify.

After the release of the single, Kygo announced that he was embarking on a worldwide tour to promote his debut studio album. Soon after, revealed that his debut studio album was going to be released on 19 February 2016, but was delayed. He, instead, released a teaser of the songs that he was working on that were on his debut studio album and released it on SoundCloud.

In the beginning of March 2016, Kygo announced that his debut studio album was going to be released on 13 May 2016, under the title Cloud Nine. He also announced that he would be releasing three promotional singles, leading up to the release of the album. The first of these singles, which was released 18 March 2016, was entitled "Fragile", which features vocals and was collaborated with Labrinth. The second single came out on 1 April 2016 and was called "Raging", which features vocals from the Irish band Kodaline and was also co-written by James Bay. The third and last single was released on 22 April 2016 and was entitled "I'm In Love", featuring vocals from James Vincent McMorrow. Kygo's debut studio album was released on 13 May 2016. Other collaborations were revealed to include Parson James, Tom Odell, Kodaline, Conrad Sewell, John Legend, James Vincent McMorrow, Foxes, Rhodes, Matt Corby, Maty Noyes, Julia Michaels and Angus & Julia Stone.

Kygo launched a new lifestyle brand called Kygo Life on 17 August 2016. The brand consists of two collections of high-fashion and relaxed wear, in addition to hardware such as headphones. Kygo Life is at the moment only available in Europe, the United States and Canada.

He performed "Carry Me" with American singer and songwriter Julia Michaels at the closing ceremony of the 2016 Summer Olympics on 21 August at the Maracanã Stadium in Rio de Janeiro, as part of a segment that promoted the new Olympic Channel service launching after the Games. This helped grow his popularity.

2017–2018: Stargazing and Kids in Love 
On 9 February 2017, Kygo posted a snippet of his collaboration with American singer Selena Gomez. They confirmed the single titled "It Ain't Me", via their social media accounts on 13 February. It was released on 16 February. The song is the lead single from Kygo's first EP, Stargazing. It was a certified hit and it streamed over 1 billion times on Spotify and 710 million times on YouTube, making it the first song by Kygo having over a billion streams on Spotify. In addition to reaching number one in Croatia, Lebanon and Norway, the song attained top five peaks in Australia, Austria, Belgium, Canada, the Czech Republic, Denmark, Finland, France, Germany, Greece, Hungary, Ireland, the Netherlands, New Zealand, Poland, Portugal, Scotland, Slovakia, Sweden and Switzerland. It also reached the top 10 in Italy, Spain, the United Kingdom and the United States. On 28 April, Kygo released the second single from the EP, "First Time", with English singer Ellie Goulding. This track was certified gold in UK on 20 February 2020 selling over 400,000 copies.

On 15 September 2017, Kygo remixed the U2 song "You're The Best Thing About Me", which was also released as his collaborative single with the band.

On 19 October 2017, Kygo announced via Facebook that his second studio album is called Kids in Love, which was released on 3 November. On 20 October, he released the lead single and title track "Kids in Love", which features The Night Game. Shortly after releasing the album, Kygo announced the Kids in Love Tour. On 16 March 2018, Kygo released "Remind Me to Forget", a track featuring American singer Miguel, as the third single from the album, which streamed 400 million times on Spotify as of 2 January 2020, following "Stranger Things" featuring the American pop rock band OneRepublic. "Stranger Things" received a remix from Alan Walker.

2018–2020: Golden Hour 
In June 2018, Kygo announced a collaboration with American rock band Imagine Dragons titled "Born to Be Yours". The single was released on 11 June. On 21 September, Kygo debuted his upcoming single, "Happy Now", a collaboration with Sandro Cavazza, during his set at the iHeartRadio Music Festival, held at the T-Mobile Arena. On 24 October, Kygo posted a clip from the single's music video on his social media account. The single was released on 26 October. It streamed 109 million times on YouTube and 330 million times on Spotify, as of 2 January 2020 In October 2018, Kygo and his manager, Myles Shear, partnered with Sony Music Entertainment and launched the Palm Tree Records label. Palm Tree Records aims to be a platform for up-and-coming artists.

"Think About You" featuring American singer Valerie Broussard was released as a single on 14 February 2019 and considered timed for Valentine's Day. "Carry On", a song with English singer Rita Ora, was released as a standalone single for the 2019 film Detective Pikachu. The song was released on 19 April 2019 through RCA Records. It has been streamed more than 174 million times on Spotify.

On 23 May 2019, Kygo released "Not OK" with American singer Chelsea Cutler. As of 2 January 2020 its YouTube video has 72 million views and on Spotify the song has been streamed over 69 million times. On 14 June 2019, Kygo released his first Norwegian-language song, with Bergen rappers Store P and Lars Vaular called "Kem kan eg ringe" and on 28 June, he remixed Whitney Houston's cover version of Steve Winwood's song "Higher Love". On 21 August, "Higher Love" reached No. 1 position on Billboard magazine's Dance Club Songs chart, making it Houston's highest-charting posthumous release to date. "Higher Love" has been streamed over 600 million times on Spotify as of September 2021. On 6 December, Kygo collaborated with The Chainsmokers on a track, named "Family".

Kygo, via his socials, teased an unreleased Avicii track known as "Forever Yours". This track was first played by Avicii at Ultra Music Festival 2016 but never completed during his lifetime so Kygo gave his tropical touches to the song after Sandro Cavazza his fellow collaborator sent him the track and with due consent from Avicii's family. The track was released on 24 January 2020. On 23 March 2020, Kygo announced via his social media that he had completed his third album titled Golden Hour. He then released the single "Like It Is", with Zara Larsson and Tyga, on 27 March 2020. On 2 April 2020, Kygo released "I'll Wait" with vocals by Sasha Sloan. The next day, a music video was released starring real-life American couple Rob Gronkowski and Camille Kostek containing personal footage of their life together. On 16 April 2020, Kygo collaborated with Moroccan-English singer Zak Abel on a track titled "Freedom".

On 11 May 2020, Kygo officially announced the track list for the Golden Hour album. On 15 May 2020, he released another track, with OneRepublic, titled "Lose Somebody", along with the pre-order for the album. Kygo released the next single from the album, "The Truth", featuring Valerie Broussard (with whom he previously collaborated on "Think About You"), on 22 May 2020. Golden Hour was released on 29 May 2020. Kygo also collaborates with Jay Sean on the track: "Out Of My Mind", but the song is not released.

On 11 July 2020, Kygo released a music video for the album track "Broken Glass" with German singer Kim Petras, 6 days later, Kygo released a remix of Tina Turner's "What's Love Got to Do with It".

On 18 September 2020, Kygo released a remix of Donna Summer's "Hot Stuff".

2021–present: Thrill of the Chase 
On 15 April 2021, Kygo released the track "Gone Are The Days" with singer James Gillespie.

On 13 August 2021, Kygo released a music video for the track "Love Me Now" featuring German singer Zoe Wees.

On 15 October 2021, Kygo released the single "Undeniable" featuring American pop-rock band X Ambassadors.

On 25 February 2022, Kygo released a song with DNCE called "Dancing Feet". It is the first song that DNCE will have on their upcoming album, after their three-year hiatus.

On 11 November 2022, Kygo surprise released his fourth album, Thrill of the Chase.

Personal life 
Kygo was previously in a relationship with Maren Platou and he is currently dating Victoria Nadine. He is a fan of Manchester United, and his favourite player was Juan Mata. He is also a fan of Formula 1 and performed a concert at the 2019 Bahrain Grand Prix. He performed at other races recently, the 2021 Mexican Grand Prix and the inaugural 2022 Miami Grand Prix.

Stage name 
Both pronunciations can be used interchangeably. Kyrre got the idea for his stage name through a username he received in high school for the digital learning platform itslearning. The service used parts of his name to create a nickname, thereof "Ky-" standing for the first two letters in his given name "Kyrre" and "-go" for the first two letters in his surname "Gørvell-Dahll". The letter ø is usually replaced with letter o in computing. In an interview with newspaper Fanaposten, Kyrre quoted; "Kygo [as an artist name] has been absolutely perfect. It is very easy to say, in both Norwegian and English. [And] I have no need to change the artist name [in the future]".

Philanthropy 
In June 2016, NRK said that Kygo is "giving 50 000 USD [...] of the profits [of his sold-out festival on 20 August]" to Frank Mugisha; Kygo was quoted: "Everyone should be permitted to live with one's sexual orientation. That is not the situation in Uganda and quite a few other countries across the world".

Discography 

Studio albums
 Cloud Nine (2016)
 Kids in Love (2017)
 Golden Hour (2020)
 Thrill of the Chase (2022)

Filmography 
Film

Television

Tour 
 Endless Summer Tour (2014)
 Cloud Nine Tour (2016)
 Kids in Love Tour (2018)
 In 2019, Kygo performed in Bahrain at the Bahrain Grand Prix.

Awards and nominations

DJ Magazine Top 100 DJ

References

External links 

 
 
 
 kygolife.com Official brand site

1991 births
21st-century Norwegian musicians
Norwegian record producers
Remixers
Norwegian DJs
Progressive house musicians
Living people
Musicians from Bergen
Musicians from Tønsberg
Tropical house musicians
Downtempo musicians
Norwegian house musicians
Electronic dance music DJs
21st-century Norwegian male musicians
Ultra Records artists
RCA Records artists
Singaporean people of Norwegian descent